Psycholinguistics or psychology of language is the study of the interrelation between linguistic factors and psychological aspects. The discipline is mainly concerned with the mechanisms by which language is processed and represented in the mind and brain; that is, the psychological and neurobiological factors that enable humans to acquire, use, comprehend, and produce language.

Psycholinguistics is concerned with the cognitive faculties and processes that are necessary to produce the grammatical constructions of language. It is also concerned with the perception of these constructions by a listener.

Initial forays into psycholinguistics were in the philosophical and educational fields, due mainly to their location in departments other than applied sciences (e.g., cohesive data on how the human brain functioned). Modern research makes use of biology, neuroscience, cognitive science, linguistics, and information science to study how the mind-brain processes language, and less so the known processes of social sciences, human development, communication theories, and infant development, among others.

There are several subdisciplines with non-invasive techniques for studying the neurological workings of the brain. For example: neurolinguistics has become a field in its own right; and developmental psycholinguistics, as a branch of psycholinguistics, concerns itself with a child's ability to learn language.

Areas of study
Psycholinguistics is an interdisciplinary field that consists of researchers from a variety of different backgrounds, including psychology, cognitive science, linguistics, speech and language pathology, and discourse analysis. Psycholinguists study how people acquire and use language, according to the following main areas: 

 language acquisition: how do children acquire language?
 language comprehension: how do people comprehend language?
 language production: how do people produce language?
 second language acquisition: how do people who already know one language acquire another one?

A researcher interested in language comprehension may study word recognition during reading, to examine the processes involved in the extraction of orthographic, morphological, phonological, and semantic information from patterns in printed text. A researcher interested in language production might study how words are prepared to be spoken starting from the conceptual or semantic level (this concerns connotation, and possibly can be examined through the conceptual framework concerned with the semantic differential). Developmental psycholinguists study infants' and children's ability to learn and process language.

Psycholinguistics further divide their studies according to the different components that make up human language.

Linguistics-related areas include:
 Phonetics and phonology are the study of speech sounds. Within psycholinguistics, research focuses on how the brain processes and understands these sounds.
 Morphology is the study of word structures, especially between related words (such as dog and dogs) and the formation of words based on rules (such as plural formation).
 Syntax is the study of how words are combined to form sentences.
 Semantics deals with the meaning of words and sentences. Where syntax is concerned with the formal structure of sentences, semantics deals with the actual meaning of sentences.
 Pragmatics is concerned with the role of context in the interpretation of meaning.

History
In seeking to understand the properties of language acquisition, psycholinguistics has roots in debates regarding innate versus acquired behaviors (both in biology and psychology). For some time, the concept of an innate trait was something that was not recognized in studying the psychology of the individual. However, with the redefinition of innateness as time progressed, behaviors considered innate could once again be analyzed as behaviors that interacted with the psychological aspect of an individual. After the diminished popularity of the behaviorist model, ethology reemerged as a leading train of thought within psychology, allowing the subject of language, an innate human behavior, to be examined once more within the scope of psychology.

Origin of "psycholinguistics" 
The theoretical framework for psycholinguistics began to be developed before the end of the 19th century as the "Psychology of Language". The work of Edward Thorndike and Frederic Bartlett laid the foundations of what would come to be known as the science of psycholinguistics. In 1936 Jacob Kantor, a prominent psychologist at the time, used the term "psycholinguistic" as a description within his book An Objective Psychology of Grammar. 

However, the term "psycholinguistics" only came into widespread usage in 1946 when Kantor's student Nicholas Pronko published an article entitled "Psycholinguistics: A Review". Pronko's desire was to unify myriad related theoretical approaches under a single name. Psycholinguistics was used for the first time to talk about an interdisciplinary science "that could be coherent", as well as being the title of Psycholinguistics: A Survey of Theory and Research Problems, a 1954 book by Charles E. Osgood and Thomas A. Sebeok.

Theories

Language acquisition

Though there is still much debate, there are two primary theories on childhood language acquisition:

 the behaviorist perspective, whereby all language must be learned by the child; and
 the innatist perspective, which believes that the abstract system of language cannot be learned, but that humans possess an innate language faculty or access to what has been called "universal grammar".

The innatist perspective began in 1959 with Noam Chomsky's highly critical review of B.F. Skinner's Verbal Behavior (1957). This review helped start what has been called the cognitive revolution in psychology. Chomsky posited that humans possess a special, innate ability for language, and that complex syntactic features, such as recursion, are "hard-wired" in the brain. These abilities are thought to be beyond the grasp of even the most intelligent and social non-humans. When Chomsky asserted that children acquiring a language have a vast search space to explore among all possible human grammars, there was no evidence that children received sufficient input to learn all the rules of their language. Hence, there must be some other innate mechanism that endows humans with the ability to learn language. According to the "innateness hypothesis", such a language faculty is what defines human language and makes that faculty different from even the most sophisticated forms of animal communication.

The field of linguistics and psycholinguistics has since been defined by pro-and-con reactions to Chomsky. The view in favor of Chomsky still holds that the human ability to use language (specifically the ability to use recursion) is qualitatively different from any sort of animal ability. This ability may have resulted from a favorable mutation or from an adaptation of skills that originally evolved for other purposes.

The view that language must be learned was especially popular before 1960 and is well represented by the mentalistic theories of Jean Piaget and the empiricist Rudolf Carnap. Likewise, the behaviorist school of psychology puts forth the point of view that language is a behavior shaped by conditioned response; hence it is learned. The view that language can be learned has had a recent resurgence inspired by emergentism. This view challenges the "innate" view as scientifically unfalsifiable; that is to say, it cannot be tested. With the increase in computer technology since the 1980s, researchers have been able to simulate language acquisition using neural network models.

Language comprehension

The structures and uses of language are related to the formation of ontological insights. Some see this system as "structured cooperation between language-users" who use conceptual and semantic deference in order to exchange meaning and knowledge, as well as give meaning to language, thereby examining and describing "semantic processes bound by a 'stopping' constraint which are not cases of ordinary deferring." Deferring is normally done for a reason, and a rational person is always disposed to defer if there is good reason.

The theory of the "semantic differential" supposes universal distinctions, such as:

 Typicality: that included scales such as "regular–rare", "typical–exclusive";
 Reality: "imaginary–real", "evident–fantastic", "abstract–concrete";
 Complexity: "complex–simple", "unlimited–limited", "mysterious–usual";
 Improvement or Organization: "regular–spasmodic", "constant–changeable", "organized–disorganized", "precise–indefinite";
 Stimulation: "interesting–boring", "trivial–new".

Reading

One question in the realm of language comprehension is how people understand sentences as they read (i.e., sentence processing). Experimental research has spawned several theories about the architecture and mechanisms of sentence comprehension. These theories are typically concerned with the types of information, contained in the sentence, that the reader can use to build meaning, and at what point in reading does that information becomes available to the reader. Issues such as "modular" versus "interactive" processing have been theoretical divides in the field.

A modular view of sentence processing assumes that the stages involved in reading a sentence function independently as separate modules. These modules have limited interaction with one another. For example, one influential theory of sentence processing, the "garden-path theory", states that syntactic analysis takes place first. Under this theory, as the reader is reading a sentence, he or she creates the simplest structure possible, to minimize effort and cognitive load. This is done without any input from semantic analysis or context-dependent information. Hence, in the sentence "The evidence examined by the lawyer turned out to be unreliable", by the time the reader gets to the word "examined" he or she has committed to a reading of the sentence in which the evidence is examining something because it is the simplest parsing. This commitment is made even though it results in an implausible situation: evidence cannot examine something. Under this "syntax first" theory, semantic information is processed at a later stage. It is only later that the reader will recognize that he or she needs to revise the initial parsing into one in which "the evidence" is being examined. In this example, readers typically recognize their mistake by the time they reach "by the lawyer" and must go back and reevaluate the sentence. This reanalysis is costly and contributes to slower reading times.

In contrast to the modular view, an interactive theory of sentence processing, such as a constraint-based lexical approach assumes that all available information contained within a sentence can be processed at any time. Under an interactive view, the semantics of a sentence (such as plausibility) can come into play early on to help determine the structure of a sentence. Hence, in the sentence above, the reader would be able to make use of plausibility information in order to assume that "the evidence" is being examined instead of doing the examining. There are data to support both modular and interactive views; which view is correct is debatable.

When reading, saccades can cause the mind to skip over words because it does not see them as important to the sentence, and the mind completely omits it from the sentence or supplies the wrong word in its stead. This can be seen in "Paris in thethe Spring". This is a common psychological test, where the mind will often skip the second "the", especially when there is a line break in between the two.

Language production

Language production refers to how people produce language, either in written or spoken form, in a way that conveys meanings comprehensible to others. One of the most effective ways to explain the way people represent meanings using rule-governed languages is by observing and analyzing instances of speech errors, which include speech disfluencies like false starts, repetition, reformulation and constant pauses in between words or sentences, as well as slips of the tongue, like-blendings, substitutions, exchanges (e.g. Spoonerism), and various pronunciation errors. 

These speech errors have significant implications for understanding how language is produced, in that they reflect that:
 Speech is planned in advance: speech errors such as substitution and exchanges show that one does not plan their entire sentence before they speak. Rather, their language faculty is constantly tapped during the speech production process. This is accounted for by the limitation of working memory. In particular, errors involving exchanges imply that one plans one's sentence ahead but only with regard to its significant ideas (e.g. the words that constitute the core meaning) and only to a certain extent.
 Lexicon is organized semantically and phonologically: substitution and pronunciation errors show that lexicon is organized not only by its meaning, but also its form.
 Morphologically complex words are assembled: errors involving blending within a word reflect that there seems to be a rule governing the construction of words in production (and also likely in mental lexicon). In other words, speakers generate the morphologically complex words by merging morphemes rather than retrieving them as chunks.

It is useful to differentiate between three separate phases of language production:

 conceptualization: "determining what to say"; 
 formulation: "translating the intention to say something into linguistic form";
 execution: "the detailed articulatory planning and articulation itself". 

Psycholinguistic research has largely concerned itself with the study of formulation because the conceptualization phase remains largely elusive and mysterious.

In 2020, a paper explaining that all phonemes are biological representations of physical sounds. Moreover, all phonemes possess different emotions (psychological representations) allotted by nature. These emotions are used for intellectual meanings, which we call language. The selection of meaning from emotions is made arbitrarily in accordance with geographical situations, social values, and purpose.

Methodologies

Behavioral tasks
Many of the experiments conducted in psycholinguistics, especially early on, are behavioral in nature. In these types of studies, subjects are presented with linguistic stimuli and asked to respond. For example, they may be asked to make a judgment about a word (lexical decision), reproduce the stimulus, or say a visually presented word aloud. Reaction times to respond to the stimuli (usually on the order of milliseconds) and proportion of correct responses are the most often employed measures of performance in behavioral tasks. Such experiments often take advantage of priming effects, whereby a "priming" word or phrase appearing in the experiment can speed up the lexical decision for a related "target" word later.

As an example of how behavioral methods can be used in psycholinguistics research, Fischler (1977) investigated word encoding, using a lexical-decision task. He asked participants to make decisions about whether two strings of letters were English words. Sometimes the strings would be actual English words requiring a "yes" response, and other times they would be non-words requiring a "no" response. A subset of the licit words were related semantically (e.g., cat–dog) while others were unrelated (e.g., bread–stem). Fischler found that related word pairs were responded to faster, compared to unrelated word pairs, which suggests that semantic relatedness can facilitate word encoding.

Eye-movements
Recently, eye tracking has been used to study online language processing. Beginning with Rayner (1978), the importance of understanding eye-movements during reading was established. Later, Tanenhaus et al. (1995) used a visual-world paradigm to study the cognitive processes related to spoken language. Assuming that eye movements are closely linked to the current focus of attention, language processing can be studied by monitoring eye movements while a subject is listening to spoken language.

Language production errors

The analysis of systematic errors in speech, as well as the writing and typing of language, can provide evidence of the process that has generated it. Errors of speech, in particular, grant insight into how the mind produces language while a speaker is mid-utterance. Speech errors tend to occur in the lexical, morpheme, and phoneme encoding steps of language production, as seen by the ways errors can manifest themselves. 

The types of speech errors, with some examples, include:

 Substitutions (phoneme and lexical) — replacing a sound with an unrelated sound, or a word with its antonym, saying such as "verbal outfit" instead of "verbal output", or "He rode his bike tomorrow" instead of "...yesterday", respectively;
 Blends — mixing two synonyms and saying "my stummy hurts" in place of either "stomach" or "tummy";
 Exchanges (phoneme [aka spoonerisms] and morpheme) — swapping two onset sounds or two root words, and saying "You hissed my mystery lectures" instead of "You missed my history lectures", or "They're Turking talkish" instead of "They're talking Turkish", respectively;
 Morpheme shifts — moving a function morpheme such as "-ly" or "-ed" to a different word and saying "easy enoughly" instead of "easily enough",
 Perseveration — incorrectly starting a word with a sound that was a part of the previous utterance, such as saying "John gave the goy a ball" instead of "John gave the boy a ball";
 Anticipation — replacing a sound with one that belongs later in the utterance, such as saying "She drank a cot cup of tea" instead of "She drank a hot cup of tea".

Speech errors will usually occur in the stages that involve lexical, morpheme, or phoneme encoding, and usually not in the first step of semantic encoding. This can be attributed to a speaker still conjuring the idea of what to say; and unless he changes his mind, can not be mistaken for what he wanted to say.

Neuroimaging

Until the recent advent of non-invasive medical techniques, brain surgery was the preferred way for language researchers to discover how language affects the brain. For example, severing the corpus callosum (the bundle of nerves that connects the two hemispheres of the brain) was at one time a treatment for some forms of epilepsy. Researchers could then study the ways in which the comprehension and production of language were affected by such drastic surgery. Where an illness made brain surgery necessary, language researchers had an opportunity to pursue their research.

Newer, non-invasive techniques now include brain imaging by positron emission tomography (PET); functional magnetic resonance imaging (fMRI); event-related potentials (ERPs) in electroencephalography (EEG) and magnetoencephalography (MEG); and transcranial magnetic stimulation (TMS). Brain imaging techniques vary in their spatial and temporal resolutions (fMRI has a resolution of a few thousand neurons per pixel, and ERP has millisecond accuracy). Each methodology has advantages and disadvantages for the study of psycholinguistics.

Computational modeling
Computational modelling, such as the DRC model of reading and word recognition proposed by Max Coltheart and colleagues, is another methodology, which refers to the practice of setting up cognitive models in the form of executable computer programs. Such programs are useful because they require theorists to be explicit in their hypotheses and because they can be used to generate accurate predictions for theoretical models that are so complex that discursive analysis is unreliable. Other examples of computational modelling are McClelland and Elman's TRACE model of speech perception and Franklin Chang's Dual-Path model of sentence production.

Areas for further research
Psycholinguistics is concerned with the nature of the processes that the brain undergoes in order to comprehend and produce language. For example, the cohort model seeks to describe how words are retrieved from the mental lexicon when an individual hears or sees linguistic input. Using new non-invasive imaging techniques, recent research seeks to shed light on the areas of the brain involved in language processing.

Another unanswered question in psycholinguistics is whether the human ability to use syntax originates from innate mental structures or social interaction, and whether or not some animals can be taught the syntax of human language.

Two other major subfields of psycholinguistics investigate first language acquisition, the process by which infants acquire language, and second language acquisition. It is much more difficult for adults to acquire second languages than it is for infants to learn their first language (infants are able to learn more than one native language easily). Thus, sensitive periods may exist during which language can be learned readily. A great deal of research in psycholinguistics focuses on how this ability develops and diminishes over time. It also seems to be the case that the more languages one knows, the easier it is to learn more.

The field of aphasiology deals with language deficits that arise because of brain damage. Studies in aphasiology can offer both advances in therapy for individuals suffering from aphasia and further insight into how the brain processes language.

See also 

 Animal language
 Communication
 Determiner phrase
 Educational psychology
 Interpersonal communication
 Linguistic relativity
 Psychological nativism
 Reconstructive memory

References

Further reading 

A short list of books that deal with psycholinguistics, written in language accessible to the non-expert, includes:

External links

 
+
1930s neologisms